Blanka Říhová (born October 21, 1942) is a Czech immunologist. Her research involves the development of targeted drug delivery methods for cancer. She is the former director at the Institute of Microbiology of the Czech Academy of Sciences. In 2018 Říhová was made President of the Learned Society of the Czech Republic.

Early life and education 
Říhová was born in Prague. She studied science at the Charles University. She remained there for her graduate studies, and joined the Czechoslovak Academy of Sciences in 1964. On December 2, 1969, she defended her doctorate at the Institute of Microbiology of the Czechoslovak Academy of Sciences.

Research and career 
She spent much of her career in the United States, where she worked in Seattle, Salt Lake City and New York City. She visited the University of Utah where she worked alongside Jindřich Kopeček. In 1994 Říhová was appointed to the faculty at the Department of Physiology and Developmental Biology since 1994. Her research has included genetics, oncology, toxicology and medical biochemistry.

The first chemotherapy treatment was made available in 1958, and since then, several different types have been considered. Whilst chemotherapy can suppress the size of tumours, because it is non-specific there are several well-known side effects. The cytotoxic compounds used in chemotherapy are particularly damaging to cells which quickly divide, include hair cells and those of the reproductive systems. Říhová has worked on precision cancer treatments that can target cancer cells but not trigger a cytokine storm. This form of targeted drug delivery makes use of a polymer-based macromolecular prodrug, where antibodies that can identify tumour cells and cytotoxic anti-cancer drugs are attached to the backbone. This allows for the treatment to selectively attack and destroy cancer cells, by using the antibody to tag the tumour, and selectively inducing an immune response. By encouraging the immune response within the tumour cells themselves, Říhová avoids any of the side effects of chemotherapy. This type of treatment may decrease the amount of time that cancer patients need to spend in hospital. She believes that this type of treatment is best suited for patients with breast cancer, lung cancer and colorectal cancer. In 2011 she was a finalist for the European Inventor Award.

During the COVID-19 pandemic, Říhová provided expert commentary on the immune system response to SARS-CoV-2. She called for people to wear face masks to prevent the spread of the disease, because asymptomatic carriers will not know that they are vectors. In late April Říhová remarked that lifting of strict quarantine should only happen gradually, during which time there should be constant monitoring and testing.

Professional service 
Říhová was made Head of Research at the Czechoslovak Academy of Sciences in 1990. She served as Chair of the Czech Immunological Society from 1994 to 2000 she sat on the Academic Council of the Academy of Sciences of the Czech Republic, from 2004 to 2007 she was the vice-chairwoman of the Learned Society of the Czech Republic. Since 2007 she has acted as Head of the Department of Immunology. She was made European Ambassador for Creativity and Innovation in 2009. In 2018 she was elected President of the Learned Society of the Czech Republic. She is a member of the scientific council of the Czech Academy of Sciences.

Awards and honours 
 1987 – Jan Evangelista Purkyně medal of the Czechoslovak Academy of Sciences for achieved results in biology
 1996 – Elected a member of the Learned Society of the Czech Republic
 2005 – Česká hlava Invention Award for Polymeric Drugs with Cytostatic and Immunomodulatory Effects
 2006 – Medal of the Russian Academy of Natural Sciences "For Merit in Public Health"
 2012 – Čestná medaile De scientia et humanitate optime meritis
 2013 – Medal of the Learned Society of the Czech Republic
 2017 – TOP Women of the Czech Republic competition

Selected publications

References 

Czechoslovak physicians
Living people
1942 births
Academic staff of Charles University
Charles University alumni
Czechoslovak emigrants to the United States
American emigrants to the Czech Republic
Czech women biologists
Czech immunologists
Czech women physicians